The CECAFA Women's U-17 Championship is a football (soccer) tournament in Africa. It is organised by the Council of East and Central Africa Football Associations (CECAFA), and includes women's national under 17 teams from Central and East Africa.

History

Results

Participating nations
Legend

 – Champions
 – Runners-up
 – Third place
 – Fourth place
 – Losing semi-finals
QF – Quarter-finals
GS – Group stage

Q — Qualified for upcoming tournament
 – Did not qualify
 – Withdrew
 – Hosts

References

CECAFA competitions